ʿUmar ibn Saʿd (fl. 620–686) was a son of Muhammad's companion, Sa'd ibn Abi Waqqas. He was born in Medina and later moved to Kufa, which was founded by his father and stayed there until his death.

He took orders from Ubaydullah ibn Ziyad. He was one of the leaders of the troops who killed Husayn ibn Ali in the Battle of Karbala in 680, the first major battle of the Second Islamic Civil War (Second Fitna).

His wife was the sister to Mukhtar al-Thaqafi, who ruled Iraq from 685 to 687, during the Second Fitna. He had five sons, Hafs ibn Umar ibn Sa'd ibn Abi Waqqas camed in battle of Karbala.

Umar ibn Sa'd was killed by Abu Amra Kaysan, on the orders of Mukhtar al-Thaqafi, for his involvement in the Battle of Karbala.

References

7th-century Arabs
620 births
727 deaths
People of the Second Fitna
Banu Zuhrah